Hemicythara octangulata is a species of sea snail, a marine gastropod mollusk in the family Mangeliidae.

Description
The length of the shell attains 10 mm, its diameter 4 mm.
 
The solid, subfusiform shell is ovately oblong and obtusely shouldered, strongly longitudinally ribbed (eight in the body whorl) and transversely .  The shell contains six whorls with a distinct suture. The aperture is narrow. The outer lip is slightly incrassate. The siphonal canal is very short. The columella is almost upright. The color of the shell is yellowish white, with an interrupted chestnut band.

Distribution
This marine species occurs off Japan, Korea and the Philippines.

References

External links
  Tucker, J.K. 2004 Catalog of recent and fossil turrids (Mollusca: Gastropoda). Zootaxa 682:1–1295.
 
 Pilsbry & Stearns (1895) Catalogue of the marine mollusks of Japan, with descriptions of new species and notes on others collected by Frederick Stearns; Detroit,Frederick Stearns,1895. 
 Ohgaki, Shun-Ichi, Ken-Ichi Komemoto, and Nobutaka Funayama. "2. List of recorded species." (2011)
 Cho, In-Young, et al. "A study on the biodiversity of benthic invertebrates in the waters of Seogwipo, Jeju Island, Korea." Journal of Asia-Pacific Biodiversity 7.1 (2014): e11-e18.

octangulata
Gastropods described in 1860